Ekwall is a surname. Notable people with the surname include:

Eilert Ekwall (1877–1964), Swedish Professor of English at Lund University
Emma Ekwall (1838–1925), Swedish painter
Harald Ekwall (1873–unknown), Chilean sports shooter
Knut Ekwall (1843–1912), Swedish painter and illustrator
Patrick Ekwall (born 1965), Swedish sports journalist
Sofia Maria Ekwall (1826–1897), Swedish female murderer
William A. Ekwall (1887–1956), United States Representative from Oregon and a Judge of the United States Customs Court